The 1939 Currie Cup was the 20th edition of the Currie Cup, the premier domestic rugby union competition in South Africa.

This was the first time in the history of the competition that a final was held to determine the winner.

Tables

Northern Section

Southern Section

Fixtures and Results

Northern Section

Southern Section

Final

See also

 Currie Cup

References

1939
1939 in South African rugby union
Currie